Mexico High School may refer to:

Mexico High School, Mexico, Maine, which merged into the Mountain Valley High School
Mexico Senior High School, Mexico, Missouri
Mexico High School (New York), Mexico, New York